The 2017 Asian Men's Volleyball Championship was the nineteenth staging of the Asian Men's Volleyball Championship, the biennial international men's volleyball championship of Asia organised by the Asian Volleyball Confederation (AVC) with Indonesian Volleyball Federation (PBVSI). The tournament was held in Gresik, Indonesia from 24 July to 1 August 2017.

Qualification
The 16 AVC member associations submitted their men's national team to the 2017 Asian Championship. The 16 AVC member associations were from 5 zonal associations, including, Central Asia (4 teams), East Asia (5 teams), Oceania (1 team), Southeast Asia (3 teams), and West Asian teams (3 teams).

Qualified teams
The following teams qualified for the tournament.

Pools composition

Preliminary round
Teams were seeded in the first two positions of each pool following the serpentine system according to their FIVB World Ranking as of 22 August 2016. AVC reserved the right to seed the hosts as head of pool A regardless of the World Ranking. All teams not seeded were drawn in Bangkok, Thailand on 27 February 2017. Rankings are shown in brackets except the hosts who ranked 42nd.

Draw

Classification round

Squads

Venues

Pool standing procedure
 Number of matches won
 Match points
 Sets ratio
 Points ratio
 If the tie continues as per the point ratio between two teams, the priority will be given to the team which won the last match between them. When the tie in points ratio is between three or more teams, a new classification of these teams in the terms of points 1, 2 and 3 will be made taking into consideration only the matches in which they were opposed to each other.

Match won 3–0 or 3–1: 3 match points for the winner, 0 match points for the loser
Match won 3–2: 2 match points for the winner, 1 match point for the loser

Preliminary round
All times are Indonesia Western Time (UTC+07:00).

Pool A

|}

|}

Pool B

|}

|}

Pool C

|}

|}

Pool D

|}

|}

Classification round
All times are Indonesia Western Time (UTC+07:00).
The results and the points of the matches between the same teams that were already played during the preliminary round shall be taken into account for the classification round.

Pool E

|}

|}

Pool F

|}

|}

Pool G

|}

|}

Pool H

|}

|}

Final round
All times are Indonesia Western Time (UTC+07:00).

13th–16th places

13th–16th semifinals

|}

15th place match

|}

13th place match

|}

9th–12th places

9th–12th semifinals

|}

11th place match

|}

9th place match

|}

Final eight

Quarterfinals

|}

5th–8th semifinals

|}

Semifinals

|}

7th place match

|}

5th place match

|}

3rd place match

|}

Final

|}

Final standing

Awards

Most Valuable Player
 Yūki Ishikawa
Best Setter
 Naonobu Fujii
Best Outside Spikers
 Yūki Ishikawa
 Vitaliy Vorivodin

Best Middle Blockers
 Nodirkhan Kadirkhanov
 Haku Ri
Best Opposite Spiker
 Rivan Nurmulki
Best Libero
 Oh Jae-seong

See also
2017 Asian Women's Volleyball Championship

References

External links
Official website
Regulations
Squads

Asian Volleyball Championship
Asian men's volleyball championships
2017 in Indonesian sport
International volleyball competitions hosted by Indonesia
Gresik Regency
July 2017 sports events in Asia
August 2017 sports events in Asia